Forcepstail may refer to:
Japygidae, a family of two-pronged bristletails.
Aphylla, genus of dragonflies commonly known as greater forcepstails.
Phyllocycla, genus of dragonflies commonly known as lesser forcepstails.

Animal common name disambiguation pages